Divya Prakash Dubey (born 8 May 1982) is an Indian Hindi author. He has written six books: a couple of collection of stories in Hindi, Terms and Conditions Apply and Masala Chai, and  four short novels which includes Musafir Cafe, October Junction, Ibnebatuti and Aako Baako. He is also working on a new art of ‘Storybaazi’.

Early life 
Divya Prakash Dubey grew up in Hardoi, Shahjahanpur,Ghaziabad, Lucknow and Varanasi. After completing his degree in Computer Science Engineering from College of Engineering Roorkee, he pursued MBA from Symbiosis Institute of Business Management, Pune. He got placed in a top MNC and started writing stories alongside that got published later.

List of works

Books

 इब्नेबतूती  a Hindi Novel publishing in July 2020 by Hind Yugm Westland (first edition)

 October Junction, a Hindi Novel publishing on 1 January 2019 by Hind Yugm Westland (first edition)
Musafir Cafe, a Hindi Novel published on 14 September 2016 by Hind Yugm Westland (first edition)
Masala Chai, a collection of short stories in Hindi published by Hind Yugm, New Delhi in 2014 (first edition)
Terms & Conditions Apply, a collection of short stories in Hindi published by Hind Yugm, New Delhi in 2013 (first edition)

References

External links

1982 births
Living people
IIT Roorkee alumni
Indian male novelists
Indian writers
Novelists from Uttar Pradesh
People from Lucknow